The 1961 Chicago White Sox season was the team's 61st season in the major leagues, and its 62nd season overall. They finished with a record of 86–76, good enough for fourth place in the American League, 23 games behind the first-place New York Yankees. Their pitching staff surrendered 13 of Roger Maris's 61 home runs that year, the most of any team.

Offseason 
 December 14, 1960: 1960 MLB expansion draft
 Earl Averill, Jr. was drafted from the White Sox by the Los Angeles Angels.
 Jim McAnany was drafted from the White Sox by the Los Angeles Angels.

Regular season

Season standings

Record vs. opponents

Opening Day lineup 
 Luis Aparicio, SS
 Nellie Fox, 2B
 Minnie Miñoso, LF
 Roy Sievers, 1B
 J. C. Martin, 3B
 Al Smith, RF
 Jim Landis, CF
 Sherm Lollar, C
 Early Wynn, P

Notable transactions 
 May 10, 1961: Wes Covington was selected off waivers by the Chicago White Sox from the Milwaukee Braves.
 May 15, 1961: Joe Ginsberg was released by the White Sox.
 June 1, 1961: Warren Hacker was purchased by the White Sox from the Philadelphia Phillies.
 June 10, 1961: Wes Covington, Stan Johnson, Bob Shaw, and Gerry Staley were traded by the White Sox to the Kansas City Athletics for Ray Herbert, Don Larsen, Andy Carey, and Al Pilarcik.

Roster

Player stats

Batting 
Note: G = Games played; AB = At bats; R = Runs scored; H = Hits; 2B = Doubles; 3B = Triples; HR = Home runs; RBI = Runs batted in; BB = Base on balls; SO = Strikeouts; AVG = Batting average; SB = Stolen bases

Pitching 
Note: W = Wins; L = Losses; ERA = Earned run average; G = Games pitched; GS = Games started; SV = Saves; IP = Innings pitched; H = Hits allowed; R = Runs allowed; ER = Earned runs allowed; HR = Home runs allowed; BB = Walks allowed; K = Strikeouts

Farm system 

Harlan affiliation shared with New York Yankees

Notes

References 
 1961 Chicago White Sox at Baseball Reference

Chicago White Sox seasons
Chicago White Sox season
Chicago White Sox